Likewise is the debut studio album by Frances Quinlan of Hop Along. It was released on January 31, 2020, by Saddle Creek Records.

Production 

Likewise is Frances Quinlan's first solo album under their own name. They had earlier released a solo album, Freshman Year, as Hop Along, Queen Ansleis, in 2005. Quinlan recorded Likewise with Joe Reinhart, a bandmate from Hop Along. They felt that the recording experience opened their instrumentation palette beyond the guitar and made them a more adventurous collaborator. New instruments in their repertoire include strings, autoharp, and synthesizers.

Saddle Creek announced the record in October 2019 for a January 31, 2020, release. The lead single, "Rare Thing", accompanied the announcement. Based on a dream about their infant niece, the song explores the ability to love generously. Likewise second single, "Now That I'm Back", followed the next month. The song addresses the long road of learning to compromise in a romantic relationship. Quinlan released "Your Reply", a celebratory song about nearly understanding someone, early in January 2020. The album's last song, a cover of Built to Spill's "Carry the Zero", is a favorite of Quinlan's, often played in their solo sets and soundchecks.

Quinlan created the album's cover art. A limited edition release of the album on colored vinyl included autographed artwork. A promotional tour for the album is set to run from January to March 2020.

Critical reception 

At Metacritic, which assigns a weighted average rating out of 100 to reviews from mainstream publications, this release received an average score of 83, based on 12 reviews.
The album was one of Pitchfork most anticipated in 2020.

Accolades

Track listing

See also
List of 2020 albums

References

External links 

 

2020 albums
Saddle Creek Records albums
Frances Quinlan albums